Soto is a rural locality (a selo) in Dogdoginsky Rural Okrug of Megino-Kangalassky District in the Sakha Republic, Russia, located  from Mayya, the administrative center of the district, and  from Byokyo, the administrative center of the rural okrug. Its population as of the 2010 Census was 3; down from 28 recorded in the 2002 Census.

References

Notes

Sources
Official website of the Sakha Republic. Registry of the Administrative-Territorial Divisions of the Sakha Republic. Megino-Kangalassky District. 

Rural localities in Megino-Kangalassky District